Adam Wall House is a historic home located near Prices Fork, Montgomery County, Virginia.  It was built about 1850, and is a two-story, five-bay, log dwelling with a modified hall and parlor plan.  It is sheathed in weatherboard, and has a gable roof, exterior brick end chimneys, one-story porch, and a two-story frame ell.  Also on the property is a contributing log meathouse or smokehouse.

It was listed on the National Register of Historic Places in 1989.

References

Houses on the National Register of Historic Places in Virginia
Houses completed in 1850
Houses in Montgomery County, Virginia
National Register of Historic Places in Montgomery County, Virginia